Alfonso Martínez may refer to:
Alfonso Martínez Domínguez (1922–2002), Mexican politician
Alfonso Martínez de Toledo (c. 1398–c. 1470), Castilian poet and writer
Alfonso Martinez (actor) (born 1988), Filipino actor
Alfonso Martínez (football manager)
Alfonso Martínez (taekwondo), Belizean taekwondo martial artist
Alfonso Martínez (basketball)